Daniel F. O'Brien Jr. (born c. 1954) is an American baseball executive who served as general manager of the Cincinnati Reds of Major League Baseball (MLB) from October 2003 to January 2006.

Biography
O'Brien began his career in the Seattle Mariners front office in 1977 (the team's inaugural season), then switched to the Houston Astros in 1982, serving first as the team's farm system director and then its scouting director through 1996. He was assistant general manager of the Texas Rangers from 1997 until changing organizations in 2003.

O'Brien was hired as the general manager of the Cincinnati Reds on October 27, 2003, succeeding Jim Bowden. He was fired by new Reds ownership on January 23, 2006. He then served as a special assistant to Milwaukee Brewers GM Doug Melvin during 2007–2009.

O'Brien earned degrees at Rollins College and Ohio University. His father, Dan O'Brien Sr., was the general manager of three teams in the American League West division from 1974 through 1993: the Texas Rangers, Seattle Mariners (where he also was club president) and the California Angels.

References

Date of birth missing (living people)
Place of birth missing (living people)
1950s births
Living people
Rollins College alumni
Ohio University alumni
Houston Astros executives
Milwaukee Brewers executives
Texas Rangers executives
Cincinnati Reds executives
Seattle Mariners executives
Major League Baseball general managers
Major League Baseball scouting directors